is a railway station on the Ainokaze Toyama Railway Line in the city of Toyama, Toyama Prefecture, Japan, operated by the third-sector railway operator Ainokaze Toyama Railway.

Lines

Station layout 
Kureha Station has one side platform and one island platform connected by a footbridge. The station is staffed.

Platforms

History
Kureha Station opened on 3 November 1908 as a station on the Japanese Government Railway (JGR). It was privatized on 1 April 1984, becoming a station on JR West.

From this date, Kureha Station was transferred to the ownership of the third-sector operating company Ainokaze Toyama Railway.

Adjacent stations

Passenger statistics
In fiscal 2015, the station was used by an average of 1,734 passengers daily (boarding passengers only).

Surrounding area 
 Toho Gakuen Graduate School

See also
 List of railway stations in Japan

References

External links

  

Railway stations in Toyama Prefecture
Railway stations in Japan opened in 1908
Ainokaze Toyama Railway Line
Toyama (city)